USS Jackdaw (AMS-21/YMS-373) was a  built for the United States Navy during World War II. She was the third U.S. Navy ship to be named for the jackdaw.

History
USS YMS-373 was constructed at the Weaver Shipyards, Orange, Texas. She was laid down 28 December 1942, launched 29 January 1944, and commissioned as USS YMS-373 on 29 April 1944.

On 18 February 1947 YMS-373 was reclassified as a minesweeper, USS Jackdaw (AMS-21).

Jackdaw was transferred in 1960 to Brazil, which named her Jurvá.

See also 
  for other ships with the same name.

References

External links 
 Photo gallery at Navsource.org

YMS-1-class minesweepers of the United States Navy
Ships built in Orange, Texas
1944 ships
World War II minesweepers of the United States
Javari-class minesweepers